North India, according to combined definition by the Ministry of Home Affairs, Geological Survey of India and Ministry of Culture refers to the northern region of India comprising the states of Uttar Pradesh, Uttarakhand, Punjab, Haryana, Himachal Pradesh, Rajasthan and the Union Territories of Delhi, Jammu & Kashmir, Ladakh and Chandigarh.

List
The following is the list cities in North India, sorted by their population. The population statistics indicated in this article are for the year 2011, in accordance with the 15th Indian Census.

{{location map+|India|float=right|width=530|caption=Location of 1 million-plus cities in North India. Red dots represent capital cities of their respective states|places=

{{Location map~|India|label=Lucknow|mark=Red_pog.svg|position=right|lat=26.8|long=80.9}}

}}

 The cities which are listed in bold' are the capital of the respective state / union territory / country.

See also

 List of most populous metropolitan areas in India
 List of cities in Uttar Pradesh by population 
 List of cities in India

References

North India
Cities by population